The Cotter Tunnel is a railroad tunnel just outside Cotter, Arkansas. It brings the Missouri and Northern Arkansas Railroad under a ridge, over which U.S. Route 62 (US 62) travels. The southeastern portal is finished in sprayed concrete, while the northeastern portal is unfinished. The tunnel was built in 1903-04 by the White River Division of the Missouri Pacific Railroad, and formed a vital transportation link to the area at that time. The rail line continues to see active freight service.

The tunnel was listed on the National Register of Historic Places in 2007.

See also
National Register of Historic Places listings in Marion County, Arkansas
List of bridges on the National Register of Historic Places in Arkansas

References

Railway tunnels on the National Register of Historic Places
Transport infrastructure completed in 1904
Transportation in Marion County, Arkansas
Tunnels in Arkansas
National Register of Historic Places in Marion County, Arkansas
Railway buildings and structures on the National Register of Historic Places in Arkansas
1904 establishments in Arkansas
Tunnels completed in 1904
Missouri Pacific Railroad